On September 16, 1994, there was a UFO sighting outside Ruwa, Zimbabwe. 69 pupils at the Ariel School aged between six and twelve claimed that they saw one or more silver craft descend from the sky and land on a field near their school. One or more creatures dressed all in black then approached the children and telepathically communicated to them a message with an environmental theme, frightening the children and causing them to cry.

The Fortean writer Jerome Clark has called the incident the “most remarkable close encounter of the third kind of the 1990s”. Skeptics have described the incident as one of mass hysteria. Not all the children at the school that day claimed that they saw something. Several of those that did maintain that their account of the incident is true.

Background
Ruwa is a small agricultural centre located 22 km south-east of the capital Harare. At the time of the incident, it was not a town but only a local place-name, "little more than a crossroads in an agricultural region".

Ariel School was an expensive private school. Most of the pupils were from wealthy white families in Harare.

Two days prior to the incident at Ariel there had been a number of UFO sightings throughout southern Africa. There had been numerous reports of a bright fireball passing through the sky at night. Many people answered ZBC Radio's request to call-in and describe what they had seen. Although some witnesses interpreted the fireball as a comet or meteor, it resulted in a wave of UFO mania in Zimbabwe at the time.

According to skeptic Brian Dunning, the fireball "had been the re-entry of the Zenit-2 rocket from the Cosmos 2290 satellite launch. The booster broke up into burning streaks as it moved silently across the sky, giving an impressive light show to millions of Africans." Local UFO researcher Cynthia Hind recorded other alien sightings at this time, including a daylight sighting by a young boy and his mother and a report of alien beings on a road by a trucker.

Incident
The sightings at Ariel occurred at 10am on September 16, 1994, when pupils were outside on mid-morning break. The adult faculty at the school were inside having a meeting at the time. The entire incident lasted about fifteen minutes.  When the children returned to class they told the teachers what they had seen but were dismissed.

When they returned home they told their parents. Many of those parents came to the school the next day to discuss what had happened with the faculty. The sighting was reported on ZBC Radio, from where Cynthia Hind learned about it.

The BBC's correspondent in Zimbabwe, Tim Leach, visited the school on September 19 to film interviews with pupils and staff.<ref name="BBC">{{cite news |title='The schoolkids who said they saw 'aliens |work=BBC News |url=https://www.bbc.com/news/av/stories-57749238 |access-date=17 September 2021 |archive-date=7 September 2021 |archive-url=https://web.archive.org/web/20210907220323/https://www.bbc.com/news/av/stories-57749238 |url-status=live }}</ref> After investigating this incident, Leach claimed "I could handle war zones, but I could not handle this". Hind visited the school on September 20 1994. She interviewed some of the children and asked them to draw pictures of what they had seen. She reported that the children all told her the same story. 

That November Harvard University professor of psychiatry John Mack visited the Ariel school to interview witnesses. Throughout the 1990s Mack had investigated UFO sightings and had a particular interest in the alien abduction phenomenon. In May 1994 the Dean of Harvard Medical School, Daniel C. Tosteson, appointed a committee of peers to confidentially review Mack's clinical care and clinical investigation of the people who had shared their alien encounters with him (some of their cases were written of in Mack's 1994 book Abduction). The issue was that Mack had communicated to these people that their experience may have been real. After fourteen months, Harvard issued a statement stating that the Dean had "reaffirmed Dr. Mack's academic freedom to study what he wishes and to state his opinions without impediment."

According to the interviews of Hind, Leach and Mack, 62 children between the ages of six and twelve claimed to have seen at least one UFO. Dozens more children who were present stated they had not seen any UFO or anything unusual. The basic details of the sightings were quite consistent although not all the details were. One or more silver objects, usually described as discs, appeared in the sky. They then floated down to a field of brush and small trees just outside school property.

Between one and four creatures with big eyes and dressed all in black, exited a craft and approached the children. At this point many of the children ran but some, mostly older pupils, stayed and watched the approach. According to Mack's interviews the creature or creatures then telepathically communicated to the children an environmental message, before returning to the craft and flying away. According to Dunning, this telepathic message aspect of the story was not included in Hind or Leach's reports, only Mack's, although Hind reported it later.

In Mack's interviews one fifth-grader tells how he was warned "about something that's going to happen," and that "pollution mustn't be". An eleven-year-old girl told Mack "I think they want people to know that we're actually making harm on this world and we mustn’t get too techno." One child said that he was told that the world would end because they are not taking care of the planet.

The children were adamant that they had not seen a plane. Hind noted that the different cultural background of the children gave rise to different interpretations of what they had seen and they did not all believe that they had seen extraterrestrials. She noted that some of the children thought the short little beings were tikoloshes, creatures of Shona and Ndebele folklore.

Aftermath
The Ariel School UFO incident quickly became one of the most famous UFO cases in Africa. On a June 2021 episode of the BBC's Witness History, the event was described as "one of the most significant events in UFO history". Ufologists continue to cite the case as providing compelling evidence of extraterrestrial visits to Earth. Skeptics have dismissed the incident as one of mass hysteria or even a prank.

In December 2020 Brian Dunning devoted an episode of his Skeptoid podcast to the incident. In it he noted that some children in the school claimed that they had not seen anything unusual that day. He challenged the often-repeated claim that as rural schoolchildren in Zimbabwe, the witnesses would not have had exposure to modern media and so would not have been familiar with the concept of UFOs and alien visitors. He also criticised the interviewing techniques of Hind and Mack.

Hind interviewed the children in groups of four to six with every other child allowed to listen and so their stories were cross-contaminated. Mack only interviewed the children two months after the alleged sighting and Dunning says that Mack, a known environmentalist, "prompted and suggested" the telepathic communication angle, which was not present in Hind's previous report.

Several of the witnesses maintain that what was reported is true. In 2014 the Mail & Guardian spoke to one witness who said that she fears that the creatures will return and that she can sense when they are back in the atmosphere. In 2016 witness Emily Trim exhibited paintings that she described as a "manifestation of the messages she received" from the beings that day.

In June 2021 Barstool Sports writer Zah spoke in an interview about being a pupil in Ariel that day. He recounted that he saw a bright light come down from the sky and aliens exit it. Other witnesses were interviewed for the 2020 documentary The Phenomenon'' and spoke about how the experience has affected them.

See also
 List of reported UFO sightings
 Westall UFO, a similar UFO sighting by school students

References

External links
 Photo album showing drawings made by children in the school and photographs of the school and surrounding area.
 Ariel Phenomenon, a documentary by Randall Nickerson (2022).

1994 in Zimbabwe
UFO sightings
Events in Zimbabwe
Mashonaland East Province